The Drake University College of Pharmacy and Health Sciences is an American pharmacy school located in Des Moines, Iowa. The school, part of Drake University, offers a four-year Doctor of Pharmacy (Pharm.D) degree, and is nationally accredited by the ACPE.  As of 2015 it was ranked #43 in the US.

References

External links
Official Site

Drake University
Pharmacy schools in the United States
Educational institutions established in 1882
1882 establishments in Iowa